Rostyn John Griffiths (born 10 March 1988) is an Australian professional footballer who plays as a defender or defensive midfielder for Indian Super League club Mumbai City. Griffiths is a former captain of A-League club Perth Glory. In August 2017 it was announced that Griffiths had signed a lucrative deal as a defensive midfielder for Uzbekistan giants Pakhtakor Tashkent in the Uzbek League.

One of the most expensive signings in A-League history, the big defending-midfielder has always been a standout player in the A-League. Griffiths is renowned for his ability to break up the opposition's gameplay and being the central figure to his team's build-up play.

Griffiths starred for Central Coast Mariners from 2010 until he moved to Chinese club Guangzhou R&F in 2012. That departure attracted a $1.3 million transfer fee which remains an A-League record.

Club career
Born in Stoke-on-Trent, England, Griffiths started his youth career with Australian club ECU Joondalup before moving to England to play for Blackburn Rovers where he never made a senior appearance but during the time he spent at Blackburn he joined Gretna on loan in January 2008. where he made his debut for the side against Heart of Midlothian in February.

Accrington Stanley
He signed a one-year deal with Blackburn in January 2008 and was sent on loan to Accrington Stanley for the remainder of his contract.

Adelaide United
On 3 February 2009 he was signed as an injury replacement player by A-League club Adelaide United. With the initial agreement only covering a four-week stint, there is an option to extend that to a two-year contract. However, it is a permanent deal, and not a loan.

North Queensland Fury

On 2 July 2009, it was announced that Griffiths would join A-League club North Queensland Fury for their inaugural season. On 8 August 2009 he started in Fury's first A-league match and scored the Fury's first ever goal in a competitive match against Sydney FC.

Guangzhou R&F
On 29 February 2012 it was announced that he had signed for Chinese Super League club Guangzhou for a fee that was undisclosed at the time, but later revealed to be $1.3 million, a record sum for an Australian transfer.

Perth Glory (2014–2015)
On 23 January 2014 it was announced that Griffiths returned to the A-League, signing with Perth Glory.

On 4 December 2014, Griffiths scored his first goal of the 2014–15 season against Sydney FC in the 84th minute before Andy Keogh scored in the 86th minute to earn a late 2–1 comeback.

Roda JC
On 26 July 2015, Perth Glory released Griffiths to allow him to sign a two-year deal with newly promoted Eredivise club Roda JC. Following struggles for game-time, Griffiths left Roda JC after one season on 19 April 2016.

Perth Glory (2016–2017)
On 24 July 2016, Griffiths returned once more to the A-League, signing a two-year deal with Perth Glory after trialling with them on their Philippines Tour. On 2 October 2016, he was announced as captain of the club.

Pakhtakor Tashkent

On 1 August 2017, Perth Glory announced that Griffiths would be leaving the club with immediate effect to join Uzbek League side Pakhtakor Tashkent. Griffiths left Pakhtakor in May 2018, citing family reasons.

Melbourne City
On 19 July 2018, Griffiths signed a two-year deal with Melbourne City, joining the club well before the start of the 2018–19 season.

Mumbai City
In July 2022, Mumbai City announced the signing of Griffiths from sister club Melbourne City, on a one-yeal deal. On 18 August, he made his debut for the club against Indian Navy in the Durand Cup, which ended in a 4–1 win.

International career
Griffiths has played for Australia's National under 17 team, and scored a brace on his debut against Tonga. While he was still playing for Blackburn, he was courted by Wales' national teams, due to a Welsh link on his Grandfather's side but, at that point, had not yet decided on his international allegiance.

Personal life
His younger brother, Brent Griffiths is also a professional footballer who last played for Penang in the Malaysia Super League. The brothers were together, during their stints in the youth set up of English Premier League side, Blackburn Rovers.

Career statistics

Club

Honours
Central Coast Mariners
A-League Premiership: 2011–12

Melbourne City
 A-League Premiership: 2020–21, 2021–22
 A-League Championship: 2020–21

Australia U-17
OFC U-17 Championship: 2005

References

External links
 
 
 

1988 births
Living people
Australian soccer players
Australia youth international soccer players
English footballers
English emigrants to Australia
Association football midfielders
Adelaide United FC players
Accrington Stanley F.C. players
Gretna F.C. players
Northern Fury FC players
Central Coast Mariners FC players
Blackburn Rovers F.C. players
Guangzhou City F.C. players
Perth Glory FC players
Roda JC Kerkrade players
Pakhtakor Tashkent FK players
A-League Men players
Chinese Super League players
Scottish Premier League players
English Football League players
Eredivisie players
Australian expatriate soccer players
Expatriate footballers in China
Expatriate footballers in the Netherlands
Soccer players from Perth, Western Australia